Lees Landing is an unincorporated community in Tangipahoa Parish, Louisiana, United States. The community is located   SE of Ponchatoula, Louisiana.

History
The first settlers to claim the area was Jean Batiste Denelle and his wife Elizabeth. The family sold the land a logger named Alexander Lea. Timber from all over Tangipahoa parish was hauled down to the property to be exported to New Orleans, Louisiana. The surrounding communities began to call the area Lea’s Landing. Later USGS maps were updated and the modern name of Lees Landing was used to describe the area.

References

Unincorporated communities in Tangipahoa Parish, Louisiana
Unincorporated communities in Louisiana